Allan Russell Frost (born 2 December 1942) is a former cricketer who played first-class cricket for South Australia from 1965 to 1968.

A fast bowler, Frost took a wicket with the first ball of the innings in his first first-class match when he had MCC’s Geoffrey Boycott caught by Ian Chappell on Christmas Eve 1965. He had his best season in 1966–67, when he took 33 wickets at an average of 23.69 in the Sheffield Shield. He toured New Zealand with the Australian team at the end of the season. He played in two of the four matches against New Zealand, taking six wickets, all of top-order batsmen.

His best first-class bowling figures were 5 for 28 against Wellington in February 1967. His best figures in the Sheffield Shield were 5 for 51 in the first innings against Queensland a month earlier, when he also took 4 for 22 in the second innings.

His career was curtailed by his refusal on religious grounds to play cricket on Sundays.

See also
 List of South Australian representative cricketers

References

External links

1942 births
Living people
South Australia cricketers
Australian cricketers
Cricketers from Adelaide